The  is an art gallery in Kiryū, Gunma Prefecture, Japan that concentrates on modern Japanese art.

The gallery, which opened in April 1989, presents the collection of the businessman and writer Eiji Ōkawa (1924–2008), who was born in Kiryū, and has about 6500 items. At its core are about eighty works by Shunsuke Matsumoto and Hideo Noda; there are many works by other artists associated with these two. The gallery also has a hundred sketches by Takeji Fujishima and two hundred drawings by Toshi Shimizu.

The museum has exhibitions, which are not limited to Japanese art. For example, in early 1990 it held an exhibition of Ben Shahn.

Notes

External links
 

Art museums and galleries in Japan
Museums in Gunma Prefecture
Modern art museums in Japan
Art museums established in 1989
1989 establishments in Japan
Kiryū, Gunma